"Somebody Like Me" is a 1966 single by Eddy Arnold.  "Somebody Like Me" was a number one country song spending four weeks at the top spot and a total of eighteen weeks on the chart.

Chart performance

References
 

1966 singles
Eddy Arnold songs
Songs written by Wayne Carson
Song recordings produced by Chet Atkins